The Haish Memorial Library (also known as the DeKalb Public Library) was designed by Chicago architects White and Weber (Charles E. White, Jr. and Bertram A. Weber)   and built in the art deco style of the 1930s with funds left to the library by Jacob Haish in his 1928 will. The building was added to the National Register of Historic Places in 1980.

History
The building, located in DeKalb, Illinois, was dedicated in 1931 after construction during 1930. Constructed using funds willed by Jacob Haish, $150,000 to be precise, the building marked the first time the DeKalb Library had its own building. Previously it was in the second floor of city hall, then at 125 S. 2nd St., in DeKalb. From 1923 until the Haish Library's dedication the library was housed on the second floor of the Daily Chronicle building on Lincoln Highway.

Its facade is constructed from Indiana Bedford limestone and reflects the art deco style prominent during the 1920s and 1930s. Designed by Chicago-based White & Weber, the library was originally capable of housing 80,000 volumes. The building also had an exhibition hall that could be accessed by a separate entrance. The main entrance features a formal garden. In 1979 a major addition to the library opened, the West Wing. With its addition to the National Historic Register in 1980 the Haish Memorial Library joined other DeKalb landmarks with that designation such as the Egyptian Theatre, the Gurler House, the Ellwood House and the Glidden House.

Notes

External links
DeKalb Public Library

National Register of Historic Places in DeKalb County, Illinois
DeKalb, Illinois
Art Deco architecture in Illinois
Education in DeKalb County, Illinois
Libraries on the National Register of Historic Places in Illinois